The Champion Hurdle is a greyhound racing competition held annually at Central Park Stadium. Until 2017 it was held at Wimbledon Stadium but switched to Towcester Greyhound Stadium following the closure of Wimbledon.

The event culminated on the evening of the English Greyhound Derby final  and is over hurdles being the third most valuable hurdle race behind the Grand National and Springbok. 

The race was switched to Central Park following the closure of Towcester and because Nottingham (the new hosts of the Derby) did not run hurdles races it no longer featured on Derby final night.

Past winners

Venues and distances 
1990–2009 (Wimbledon, 460m hurdles)
2010–2016 (Wimbledon, 480m hurdles)
2017–2018 (Towcester, 480m hurdles)
2019–present (Central Park, 480m hurdles)

Sponsors
1994–2006 (William Hill)
2007–2009 (Blue Square)
2010–2016 (William Hill}
2017–2018 (Star Sports)
2019–2020 (Racing Post Greyhound TV)
2021–present (Arena Racing Company)

Winning Trainers
Tom Foster 5
Ricky Holloway 5
Seamus Cahill 4

References

Greyhound racing competitions in the United Kingdom
Sport in Kent
Greyhound racing in London
Recurring sporting events established in 1990